There is no official document specifying the order of precedence in Poland. In practice, the precedence of officials in Poland is based on an outdated informal instruction dating back to 1992. Polish civil servants responsible for the protocol often need to make ad hoc decisions based on tradition, general rules of etiquette and common sense.

An official order of precedence existed during the Communist era, but it was rendered obsolete by the transition to democracy that started in 1989. In 1992, a new guideline was prepared by Prime Minister Hanna Suchocka, Foreign Minister Krzysztof Skubiszewski, and Janusz Ziółkowski, the chief of the President's chancellery. The new document, however, was never formally adopted as legally binding. Furthermore, the adoption of the current Constitution of Poland in 1997, the territorial administration reform of 1999, Poland's entry into the European Union in 2004, and other events have rendered this guideline obsolete as well.

The lack of an official regulation in this matter leaves so much ambiguity that the only office whose position in the order of precedence is generally accepted is that of the President of the Republic. In everyday usage, the precedence is often based on such criteria as: source of power (elected officials take precedence before appointed ones), position of the given office in the constitution, as well as a person's seniority and salary (better paid officials are assumed to be also more important). Many questions remain unresolved though. The marshals (speakers) of both chambers of parliament are usually considered to take precedence before the prime minister based on their position in the line of presidential succession. Opponents of this view argue that the prime minister is constitutionally more powerful and therefore should be treated as Poland's second top official. The precedence of individual ministers, as well as chiefs of chancelleries, is uncertain, as is the question of MPs' and senators' precedence before secretaries of State.

The territorial administration reform has raised the question of whether the voivode, the national government's representative in a voivodeship (region), takes precedence before the voivodeship marshal, a popularly elected head of a voivodeship, or vice versa. Similarly, with Poland's integration into the European Union, came the problem of Polish members of the European Parliament's position in the order of precedence. Another bone of contention is the position of ecclesiastical officials vis-à-vis secular ones. Traditionally, Roman Catholic clergymen are treated with great reverence in Poland and are often assigned very high – even if undue from the protocolar point of view – positions in the order of precedence.

The list below is taken from the official website of Prime Minister's Chancellery. It is based on the unofficial instruction of 1992 with later addition of several new offices created after that date. Offices that no longer exist, but are included in the list, are marked in italics.

See also 
 Order of precedence in the Polish–Lithuanian Commonwealth

References

Further reading

External links 
 Dobromir Dziewulak, Precedencja stanowisk publicznych w Polsce, "Analizy BAS", 26 January 2009

Poland
Politics of Poland